An Indian field hockey team toured the Federation of Malaya and the Colony of Singapore between 11 February and 10 March 1954. The Indian Hockey Federation XI (IHF XI) played 16 games out of which three were international fixtures. India won all matches played and scored a total of 121 goals. Captain of the touring side Balbir Singh Sr. finished with most goals (44), while Susainathan scored 25 and vice-captain Randhir Singh Gentle, 14.

Background 
The idea of inviting an India team to Malaya was first mooted in 1949 and officially expressed by G. E. N. Oehlers, then president of the Malayan Hockey Council (MHC). In November 1952, the MHC wrote to the Government of India inviting a team in 1954. It suggested that the touring side include five or six national team players and that the side play nine games in Malaya and three in Singapore. However, this was the second tour of Malaya by an Indian team; the first by the 1932 Los Angeles Olympics gold-winning national team that had toured the same year just before the Olympic Games. They played All-Malaya XI and beat them 7–0.

Squad 
A 16-member Indian squad for the tour was named on 30 October 1953. Balbir Singh Sr. was named captain of the side and Randhir Singh Gentle, the vice-captain. The squad included six players from the team that won gold at the 1952 Helsinki Olympics. The squad arrived on 9 February 1954.

The touring squad included:
Key
GK = Goalkeeper,
FB = Fullback,
HB = Halfback,
FW = Forward

Fixtures 

''Match was stopped after 25 and 65 minutes of play respectively due to rain.

See also 
 India–Malaysia field hockey record
 Sport in Malaysia
 Sport in Singapore

References 

1954 in Malayan sport
1954 in Indian sport
February 1954 sports events in Asia
March 1954 sports events in Asia
Field hockey competitions in Malaysia
Field hockey in Singapore